Si Doel Anak Sekolahan (literally translated as Doel the Schoolchild) is an Indonesian television series produced, written and directed by Rano Karno who also stars as Doel/Kasdullah. This series has a storyline about the life of Doel and his family from Betawi, who still maintain traditional values even though they live in the midst of the current modernization of urban Jakarta. Besides Rano Karno, this series also stars Benyamin Sueb, Maudy Koesnaedi, Cornelia Agatha, Aminah Cendrakasih, Mandra, Suti Karno and Basuki. 

Consisting of 6 seasons and 139 episodes, the storyline is loosely based from the novel Si Doel Anak Betawi by Aman Datuk Majoindo and also loose continuation from the film with same title directed by Sjumandjaja in 1972. In the film version, Rano Karno also plays Si Doel and Benyamin Sueb plays the role of as Doel's father. The difference is, Doel's father's name is Asman, not Sabeni like in this series.

When it first aired in 1994, the Si Doel series immediately became a favorite TV show for the Indonesian people, and was able to beat foreign serials which at that time were widely broadcast by several Indonesian television stations. The success of Si Doel Anak Sekolahan then made Rano Karno develop this story again in other versions, including Si Doel Anak Gedongan, the television movie Si Doel Anak Pinggiran, and three cinema titles although of all of them only cinema films received good success. Together with the Keluarga Cemara and Lorong Waktu, Si Doel Anak Sekolahan is often referred to as the golden masterpiece from the Indonesian television series.

Plot
Kasdullah, usually called Doel, is a native Betawi boy, trying to maintain the noble values of his family in the midst of the progress of the times and the city of Jakarta today. By his parents he was educated so that one day he could work in a large company and not follow in the footsteps of his father, Sabeni, who is an oplet driver.

In the second season, after graduating from college, Doel was again faced with the difficult problem of finding a job. He was accepted in several companies but was later banned by Sabeni after learning that Doel had to work outside Java. However, Doel is not discouraged, especially after befriending Sarah, a Indonesian-Dutch girl, who has a crush on him. On the other hand, Doel is also faced with Zainab, his childhood friend who is said to have been betrothed long ago. At the end of the second season, Sarah invites Doel and his family to vacation in Anyer.

In the third season, Sabeni died due to an accident while returning from Anyer. Doel's life burden also increases, especially since he still doesn't have a job. In addition, the relationship between Doel with Sarah and Zainab is getting more interesting with various conflicts between the three. Nearing the end of the season, Doel finally got the job he hoped for but instead brought new problems. Doel must be willing to be sent abroad to France and Switzerland to learn new machining systems. Armed with the enthusiasm and affection of Sarah and also the blessing of Mak Nyak, Doel set out to carry out the task.

In the forth season, after returning from Zurich, Switzerland, Doel still had to wait for a placement from the company where he worked. While waiting, he returned to driving the old oplet left by his father. On the other hand, Doel and Sarah's relationship is a bit strained, because Sarah is disappointed with Doel who secretly gives gifts to Zainab.

The fifth season was marked by the death of Engkong Ali which then brought sorrow to the Doel family. In addition to sad news, a good news came from Atun, who in the near future will soon marry Karyo. Besides that, Doel finally got an assignment from his office, but this time he had to go to Kalimantan for a very long period of time. Sarah, who sincerely loves Doel, asks permission to come to Kalimantan by asking Doel to marry her.

The sixth season tells the story of Doel with his life as an office employee. His deployment to Kalimantan was temporarily postponed. On the other hand, he still can't choose between Sarah and Zainab. Zainab then married a man named Henry. In the last episode, Doel finally married Sarah.

Cast

Main
 Rano Karno as Kasdullah, often called as Doel. An engineering student who helps his parents by driving oplet in his spare time. He then graduated with a bachelor's degree and worked in a heavy equipment company in Jakarta.
 Benyamin Sueb as Sabeni, often called as Babe (Doel's father), previously owned a large plot of land in Jakarta, which was still vacant, before being gradually sold for living expenses. However, he still keeps some of the money from the sale of his land for Doel's tuition fees. He died in an accident on his way home from a holiday in Anyer.
 Aminah Cendrakasih as Laila, often called as Mpok Lela or Mak Nyak (Doel's mother). She owns a small shop at her home run by herself and her daughter, Atun. After the death of her husband, she depended on her living income from oplet, home boarding business, Doel's income as an office employee and her shop business.
 Cornelia Agatha as Sarah van Heus. A girl of Indonesian-Dutch descent. At first, she was a student who was writing a thesis and then made the Doel family the object of her research. Later she has a crush on Doel and competes with Zainab who is Doel's childhood friend. She then married Doel at the end of the sixth season.
 Maudy Koesnaedi as Zainab. Doel's childhood friend that was brought up from the second season. She is a simple girl. Has a crush on Doel even though his parents have arranged an marriage with Ahong, a businessman of Chinese descent. She later married Henry at the end of season six.
 Mandra as Himself (Uncle of Doel). An illiterate and unemployed man who was later asked by Mak Nyak to continue his late husband's duties as an oplet driver.
 Suti Karno as Atun Zaitun (Doel's sister). Her formal education was discontinued due to financial constraints. She then helped his mother sell in the shop and had time to also open a salon business.
 Basuki as Karyo "Buluk". A Javanese man who rents a house owned by Sabeni. Has a crush on Atun. Often nicknamed "Buluk" by Sabeni and also often noisy with Mandra. But lately he and Mandra have helped each other in managing the oplet car that was left by Sabeni.

Recurring
 Pak Tile as Muhammad Ali (Doel's grandfather). A rich man who loves Doel more than his own son, Mandra.
 Bendot as Himself (Karyo's father-in-law). Although Karyo is divorced from his wife, he prefers to follow Karyo to live in Jakarta before returning to his hometown.
 Nunung as Herself (Karyo's sister). Has a crush on Mandra, even though Karyo doesn't like it, who tries to keep her from meeting him
 Tubagus Maulana Husni as Rohim (Zainab's stepfather), who owns a brick company.
 Tonah as Saipah, often called as Ipah or Ipeh (Zainab's stepmother), doesn't like Doel. Prefers Zainab to be married to a rich person, rather than seeing her with Doel who she considers arrogant and pretentious
 Maryati Tohir as Munaroh (Mandra's girlfriend) but later married a man named Cecep.
 Salman Alfarizi as Ahong. A rich Chinese-Indonesian man who became Rohim's business partner. Had an arranged marriage with Zainab before finally being heartbroken because Zainab married another man.
 Djoni Irawan as Roy. Doel's rival in fighting over Sarah's heart.
 Ami Prijono as William (Sarah's father)
 Ratih Dewi as Marini (Sarah's mother)
 Adam "Stardust" Jagwani as Hans (Sarah's cousin). Only appeared in the first season before going home and settling in the Netherlands.

Production
Rano Karno revealed that the plot of Si Doel Anak Sekolahan was only slightly taken from the novel Si Doel Anak Betawi written by Aman Datuk Madjoindo. Unlike in the film version in the 1970s, Rano admitted that he did not agree if his series were fully adapted from novels because he saw that times had changed and Doel in the novel version only graduated from elementary school. That's why in the series version he tells the more modern Si Doel by being described as a college graduate.

There were three actors who were illiterate during production: Bendot, Pak Tile and Nacih. To get around these obstacles, said Rano, he gave directions verbally and directly to the three players. However, Rano added, the three of them were able to absorb the scenario well. In fact, it can provide acting improvisation beyond expectations.

Oplet, based from Morris Minor 1000, became an icon in the Si Doel series. According to Rano, he found the oplet from someone in the Kramat Jati area, East Jakarta. Previously the oplet was being used as a chicken coop. Rano bought it for 525,000 rupiah in 1993. He later repaired the oplet although it still retains some of the original elements in the engine. After the filming of the Si Doel series ended, Rano then restored the oplet by replacing the engine with a Mini Cooper engine. The interior was also replaced with teak wood chairs.

Broadcast
Si Doel first aired on January 16, 1994 on RCTI. For the first season, it was mini-series with total six episodes. The success of the premiere season then made Rano Karno resume production for the second season which premiered on October 14, 1994. The third season, which premiered in 1996, became the longest season with 48 episodes. While the fourth season which aired in 1998 became the shortest season with 16 episodes.

Since the fifth season in 2000, the broadcast has shifted from RCTI to Indosiar. In the sixth season (2003), the image format of Si Doel was changed to 16:9 aspect ratio, although for television broadcasts itself, letterboxing was carried out to a 4:3 aspect ratio.

Since August 25, 2006, Si Doel was re-aired on RCTI from the first to the fourth season and then jumped to the sixth season due to copyright issues for the fifth season with Indosiar. Currently, in addition to conventional television, this series is also broadcast online through the RCTI+ application.

Further development

Si Doel Anak Gedongan (2006)
After Si Doel 6 which was released in 2003, Rano Karno had chosen not to continue Si Doel. But because of the enthusiasm of fans, Rano melted and continued Si Doel's story with the title Si Doel Anak Gedongan. Still continuing the plot after Si Doel 6, in Si Doel Anak Gedongan it was told that Doel has become a rich man with an established position in his company. Meanwhile, Mak Nyak lives with Mandra, who opens a homerental business with an inheritance from Nyak Rodiah. Atun and Mas Karyo are also happy because Atun is pregnant. Problems arise when Sarah is pregnant and Zainab is having problems with her husband. When Sarah was in need of Doel, Doel was even more concerned with Zainab who was sad because her husband had neglected her. Sarah was finally sad and chose to return to the Netherlands after learning that Doel helped Zainab who had a miscarriage. This storyline was then continued in a television film titled Si Doel Anak Pinggiran in 2011.

Si Doel Anak Pinggiran (2011)
In Si Doel Anak Pinggiran, it is explained that Doel lost his job and was even expelled by his mother-in-law because of Sarah's flight to the Netherlands, who for almost six years did not want to return to Jakarta. Now Doel's life is back to square one. He returned to the house left by his father with Mak Nyak who was sick. Atun was just left by Mas Karyo who died. Henry, Zainab's husband, chooses a divorce and on the advice of Mak Nyak, Doel marries Zainab. After marrying Zaenab, Doel was contacted by Sarah's mother to come to her house. There, Doel was met with a child he had helped while on the beach. It was there that Doel was informed that the child was his son named Abdullah/Dul.

This storyline was later developed again in the Si Doel film trilogy which was released in 2018.

Si Doel's trilogy
The Doel film trilogy was first released in 2018 under the title Si Doel the Movie. In this film, Si Doel finally meets Sarah again in the Netherlands.

In the second film titled Si Doel the Movie 2, which was released in 2019, it focused more on the figure of Zainab who was sad and unsure whether to let Doel go back to Sarah or stay with him no matter what happened.

Meanwhile, in the third film entitled Akhir Kisah Cinta Si Doel, it is told that Sarah finally chose to divorce Doel after meeting and discussing with Zainab, who was known to be pregnant. Abdullah or Doel Jr. chose to live in Jakarta when his mother chose to return to the Netherlands.

Notes

References

External links
 
 Si Doel Anak Sekolahan in RCTI+

Indonesian drama television series
1990s Indonesian television series
1994 Indonesian television series debuts
2000s Indonesian television series
2003 Indonesian television series endings
RCTI original programming